The inhibitor of apoptosis domain -- also known as IAP repeat, Baculovirus Inhibitor of apoptosis protein Repeat, or BIR -- is a structural motif found in proteins with roles in apoptosis, cytokine production, and chromosome segregation. Proteins containing BIR are known as inhibitor of apoptosis proteins (IAPs), or BIR-containing proteins (BIRPs or BIRCs), and include BIRC1 (NAIP), BIRC2 (cIAP1), BIRC3 (cIAP2), BIRC4 (xIAP), BIRC5 (survivin) and BIRC6.

BIR domains belong to the zinc-finger domain family and characteristically have a number of invariant amino acid residues, including 3 conserved cysteines and one conserved histidine, which coordinate a zinc ion. They are typically composed of 4-5 alpha helices and a three-stranded beta sheet.

External links

References 

Protein structural motifs
Protein domains